The Bureau of Yards and Docks (abbrev.: BuDocks) was the branch of the United States Navy responsible from 1842 to 1966 for building and maintaining navy yards, drydocks, and other facilities relating to ship construction, maintenance, and repair.

The Bureau was established on August 31, 1842 by an act of Congress (5 Stat. 579), as one of the five bureaus replacing the Board of Naval Commissioners established in 1815. Originally established as the Bureau of Naval Yards and Docks, the branch was renamed the Bureau of Yards and Docks in 1862.  

The Bureau was abolished effective in 1966 as part of the Department of Defense's reorganization of its material establishment, being replaced by the Naval Facilities Engineering Command (NAVFAC).

Chiefs of the Bureau
 Captain Lewis Warrington, 1842–1846
 Captain Joseph Smith, 1846–1869
 Captain Daniel Ammen, 1869–1871
 Commodore Christopher R. P. Rodgers, 1871–1874
 Commodore John C. Howell, 1874–1878
 Commodore Richard L. Law, 1878–1881
 Rear Admiral Edward T. Nichols, 1881–1885
 Commodore David B. Harmony, 1885–1889
 Commodore George D. White, 1889–1890
 Commodore Norman H. Farquhar, 1890–1894
 Commodore Edmund O. Matthews, 1894–1898
 Rear Admiral Mordecai T. Endicott, 1898–1907
 Rear Admiral Harry H. Rousseau, 1907
 Rear Admiral Richard C. Hollyday, 1907–1912
 Rear Admiral Homer R. Stanford, 1912–1916
 Rear Admiral Frederick R. Harris, 1916–1917
 Rear Admiral Charles W. Parks, 1918–1921
 Rear Admiral Luther E. Gregory, 1921–1929
 Rear Admiral Archibald L. Parsons, 1929–1933
 Rear Admiral Norman M. Smith, 1933–1937
 Rear Admiral Ben Moreell, 1937–1945
 Rear Admiral John J. Manning, 1945–1949
 Rear Admiral Joseph F. Jelley, Jr., 1949–1953
 Rear Admiral John R. Perry, 1953–1955
 Rear Admiral Robert H. Meade, 1955–1959
 Rear Admiral Eugene J. Peltier, 1959–1962
 Rear Admiral Peter Corradi, 1962–1965
 Rear Admiral Alexander C. Husband, 1965–1966
Naval Facilities Engineering Command

 Rear Admiral Walter Enger, 1969–1973
 Rear Admiral Albert R. Marchall, 1973–1977
 Rear Admiral Donal G. Iselin, 1977–1981
 Rear Admiral William M. Zobel, 1981–1984
 Rear Admiral John Paul Jones Jr., 1984–1987
 Rear Admiral Benjamin F. Montoya, 1987–1989
 Rear Admiral David Bottoroff, 1989–1992
 Rear Admiral Jack E. Buffington, 1992–1995
 Rear Admiral David J. Nash, 1995–1998
 Rear Admiral Louis M Smith, 1998–2000
 Rear Admiral Michael R. Johnson, 2000–2003
 Rear Admiral Michael K. Loose, 2003–2006
 Rear Admiral Wayne G. Shear, 2006–2010
 Rear Admiral Christopher J. Mossey, 2010–2012
 Rear Admiral Katherine L. Gregory, 2012–2014
 Rear Admiral Bret J. Muilenburg, 2015–2018
Naval Facilities Engineering Systems Command

 Rear Admiral John Korka, 2018–2022
 Rear Admiral Dean VanderLey, 2022–Present

See also
United States Navy bureau system

References

This article contains public domain information from the United States National Archives and Records Administration.

External links 
 
 
 

1842 establishments in the United States
1966 disestablishments in the United States
Yards and Docks
Military units and formations established in 1842
Military units and formations disestablished in 1966